Mantviloniai is a village in Kėdainiai district municipality, in Kaunas County, central Lithuania. It is located by the country road Aristava-Kėdainiai-Cinkiškiai. There is a meat factory located in the Mantviloniai village area. According to the 2011 census, the village has a population of 19 people.

Demography

References

Villages in Kaunas County
Kėdainiai District Municipality